The Government Farm and Nursery Workers Trade Union was a trade union in Trinidad and Tobago that merged in 1957 with the Industrial and Railway Employees Trade Union and the Works and Hydraulics Industrial Workers Union to form the National Union of Government Employees

See also

 List of trade unions
 Federated Workers Trade Union
 National Union of Government and Federated Workers

References

Defunct trade unions of Trinidad and Tobago
Agriculture and forestry trade unions
Agricultural organizations based in the Caribbean